Davy Uwimana (born 8 May 1985) is a Burundian former professional soccer player who last played for the Trois-Rivières Attak. He was born in Bujumbura, Burundi.

Career 
He began his career by FC Sélect Rive-Sud and joined than in 2007 to Trois-Rivières Attak. In 2008 was promoted to Montreal Impact, in January 2009 turned back to Trois-Rivières, who was later released.

References

External links 

Montreal Impact profile
Player profile at CanadaSoccer.com
Attak FC Profile

1985 births
Living people
Sportspeople from Bujumbura
Burundian footballers
Canadian soccer players
Black Canadian soccer players
Burundian emigrants to Canada
Canadian Soccer League (1998–present) players
Association football defenders
Montreal Impact (1992–2011) players
Naturalized citizens of Canada
USL First Division players
Burundi under-20 international footballers
FC Sélect Rive-Sud players